Yemilchyne (translit. Yemil’chyne) is an urban-type settlement in Zviahel Raion, Zhytomyr Oblast, Ukraine. Population:

References

Urban-type settlements in Zviahel Raion
Novograd-Volynsky Uyezd